Coen is a personal name of several origins. It exists as a masculine given name, and as a surname.

Surname
As a surname it may be a variant of McCown a derivative of the two Irish surnames O'Cadhain (of Connacht) and O'Comhdhain (of Ulster), it could be a Spanish or Italian variant of the Hebrew name Cohen meaning "priest", or it may be a Dutch patronym (see "Given name" below).

Coen and Levy are "Gaelic Irish surname(s) which have a foreign appearance but are nevertheless rarely if ever found indigenous outside Ireland" according to Edward MacLysaght.

People with this surname include:

 Andy Coen (1964–2022), American football coach
 Bill Coen (born 1961), American basketball coach
 Colin Coen (born 1958), Irish hurler
 Darren Coen, rugby league footballer of the 1980s
 Eleanor Coen (1916–2010), American painter
 Enrico Coen (born 1957), British plant biologist
 Ethan Coen (born 1957) American screenwriter
 Guido Coen (1915–2010), Italian-born British film producer
 Jan Pieterszoon Coen (1587–1629), Governor-General of the Dutch East Indies
 Joe Coen, Scottish footballer
 Joel Coen (born 1954), American screenwriter
 Johnny Coen (born 1991), Irish hurler
 Kevin Coen (1947–1975), Irish Republican Army member
 Mario Pirani Coen (1925–2015), Italian journalist
 Martin Coen (1933–1997), Irish priest
 Noreen Coen (born 1993), Irish camogie player
 Séamus Coen (born 1958), Irish hurler
 Shunter Coen (1902–1967), South African cricketer
 Wilbur Coen (1911–1998), American tennis player

Given name
The Dutch given name Coen (pronounced ) is, like Koen, a short form of Coenraad/Koenraad, equivalent to the English Conrad. People with this given name include:

 Coen Cuser, 14th-century Dutch knight who founded a house for the poor
 Coen Dillen (1926–1990), Dutch footballer
  (1932–2000), Dutch actor
 Coen Gortemaker (born 1994), Dutch footballer
 Coen Hemker (born 1934), Dutch biochemist
 Coen Hess (born 1996), Australian rugby footballer
 Coen Hissink (1878–1942), Dutch silent film actor
  (born 1983), Dutch keyboardist of the band Epica
 Coen de Koning (1879–1954), Dutch speed skater
 Coen Maertzdorf (born 1993), Dutch footballer
 Coen Moulijn (1937–2011), Dutch footballer
  (1920–2006), Surinamese juror, politician and writer 
 Coen van Oven (1883–1963), Dutch painter
 Coen Teulings (born 1958), Dutch economist 
 Coen Verbraak (born 1965), Dutch journalist and television producer
 Coen Vermeltfoort (born 1988), Dutch racing cyclist
 Coen van Vrijberghe de Coningh (1950–1997), Dutch actor and musician
 Coen Zuidema (born 1942), Dutch chess player

See also

 Koen
 Coenen
 Cohen (surname)
 Cohen (disambiguation)
 Cohn
 Kohn
 Cowen (disambiguation)
 Kohen
 Coen (disambiguation)

References

Dutch masculine given names
Anglicised Irish-language surnames
Kohenitic surnames
Yiddish-language surnames